Torger Hovi (23 January 1905 – 19 October 1980) was a Norwegian politician for the Labour Party.

He was elected to the Norwegian Parliament from Oppland in 1961, and was re-elected on two occasions. He had previously served three terms as a deputy representative.

Hovi was born in Øystre Slidre and was deputy mayor of Øystre Slidre municipality in the period 1959–1961. In total he held various positions there from 1937 to 1962.

References

1905 births
1980 deaths
People from Valdres
Labour Party (Norway) politicians
Members of the Storting
20th-century Norwegian politicians